The 2012–13 season was Hibernian's fourteenth consecutive season in the Scottish Premier League, having been promoted from the Scottish First Division at the end of the 1998–99 season. The club improved on its league performance in the previous season by finishing 7th in the 2012–13 Scottish Premier League, but were eliminated from the 2012–13 Scottish League Cup in the second round by Queen of the South. Hibernian progressed in the 2012–13 Scottish Cup to the 2013 Scottish Cup Final, but this was lost 3–0 to league champions Celtic.

Friendlies
Hibs announced their pre-season friendly programme on 20 June 2012. A fixture against Union Berlin was originally scheduled to be played at Easter Road, but was switched to Berlin. A match against Rapid Bucharest, scheduled for 11 July, was called off due to a waterlogged pitch. A fixture at East Fife was arranged instead.

Fixtures

Legend

Scottish Premier League
The league season began on 5 August 2012, with a 3–0 defeat against Dundee United at Tannadice. The first home game was an Edinburgh derby, which saw an improved performance by Hibs as the game ended in a 1–1 draw. Hibs earned their first win in the next game, away to St Mirren. A run of results without defeat followed, suggesting that Pat Fenlon had succeeded in rebuilding the team. Further positive results meant that Hibs reached the top of the league in November. This was followed by a run of four defeats in five matches, including a 3–2 loss to Motherwell despite having led 2–0. A win and a draw against Celtic and Hearts meant that Hibs went into the winter break with 32 points from 22 games, just one less point than they accrued in the whole of the 2011–12 season. A poor run of results after the winter break, however, meant that Hibs slipped into the bottom half of the league at the split. The match against Kilmarnock on 5 May was abandoned after 54 minutes played because a spectator had fallen gravely ill and required emergency medical assistance. A run of victories towards the end of the season meant that Hibs finished in seventh place.

Fixtures

Legend

Scottish Cup
Hibs entered the 2012–13 Scottish Cup in the fourth round, with a home tie against Edinburgh derby rivals Hearts. Hibs captain James McPake welcomed the draw, an immediate repeat of the 2012 Scottish Cup Final. A late deflected goal gave Hibs a 1–0 victory, ending a 12 match unbeaten run for Hearts in the derby. Hibs were then drawn at home against Scottish Premier League opposition for a second time, being paired with the winner of a replayed tie between Aberdeen and Motherwell. A long-range strike by Gary Deegan and a penalty save by Ben Williams were key contributions as Hibs defeated Aberdeen 1–0. The quarter-final draw gave Hibs an away tie against Kilmarnock. Leigh Griffiths scored a hat-trick as Hibs progressed to the semi-finals with a 4–2 victory at Rugby Park.

Hibs were drawn against First Division club Falkirk in the semi-finals. Hibs went into the semi-final on a poor run of form, which had cost them a place in the top half of the SPL. Falkirk took a 3–0 lead before half-time, but Hibs produced "one of the great Scottish Cup fightbacks" to win 4–3 after extra time. Celtic also won 4–3 in their semi-final, against Dundee United, to set up the 2013 Scottish Cup Final match. Despite Hibs having a bright start to the match, poor defending allowed Gary Hooper to score two first half goals for Celtic. Hibs rarely threatened another comeback and Joe Ledley scored late on to clinch a 3–0 win for Celtic.

Fixtures

Legend

Scottish League Cup
As a Scottish Premier League club that had not qualified for European competition, Hibs entered the 2012–13 Scottish League Cup in the second round. They were drawn away to Second Division club Queen of the South. Hibs manager Pat Fenlon took a risk by resting key players, including captain James McPake, and this backfired as Queen of the South won 2–0 at Palmerston Park.

Fixtures

Legend

Transfers

Hibs narrowly avoided relegation from the Scottish Premier League during the 2011–12 season. To do this, the club signed several players on loan during the January 2012 transfer window, all of whom returned to their parent clubs at the end of the season. After the 5–1 defeat by Hearts in the 2012 Scottish Cup Final, the Hibs board of directors acknowledged the necessity of rebuilding the squad. Pat Fenlon attempted to strengthen the defence by signing goalkeeper Ben Williams and defenders James McPake and Tim Clancy.

Later in the window, Fenlon complained that other Scottish clubs, particularly the relaunched Rangers, were outbidding Hibs for players. Fenlon was able to sign veteran Finnish striker Shefki Kuqi to provide an experienced target man. Towards the end of the window, Fenlon commented that he was looking for more midfielders, as he was left without cover during a match against St Mirren. Defender Ryan McGivern was signed on loan from Manchester City on the last day of the window, but Fenlon said afterwards he was still looking to strengthen one area of the squad. He managed to strengthen the central midfield position in September, after signing free agent Tom Taiwo to a two-year deal.

Approaching the January transfer window, Fenlon said that his main priority was an attempt to secure the services of the three loaned players (Griffiths, McGivern and Jorge Claros). It was confirmed on 16 January that the deals for Griffiths and McGivern had been extended to the end of the season. Former Hibs player Kevin Thomson, who had been released by Middlesbrough at the end of January, began training with Hibs in February. He signed a short-term contract with Hibs in March, going without salary.

Players in

Players out

Loans in

Loans out

Deaths
 11 July 2012: Bobby Nicol, 76, Hibernian, Barnsley and Berwick Rangers wing half.
 October 2012: Jim Rollo, 74, Hibernian, Oldham Athletic, Southport and Bradford City goalkeeper.

Player statistics
During the 2012–13 season, Hibs used 30 different players in competitive games. The table below shows the number of appearances and goals scored by each player.

Team statistics

League table

Division summary

See also
List of Hibernian F.C. seasons

Notes

References

2012andndash;13
Hibernian